Charles Sammarone was the mayor of the industrial city of Youngstown in northeastern Ohio.

Prior to serving in elected governmental positions, he worked as a teacher, coach and administrator in local schools.  From 1990 onward he served as president of the city council.

Notes

1943 births
Living people
Mayors of Youngstown, Ohio
Ohio Democrats
Youngstown State University alumni
Westminster College (Pennsylvania) alumni